Mitkov is a Slavic masculine surname, its feminine counterpart is Mitkova. It may refer to
Dimitar Mitkov (born 2000), Bulgarian football striker
Evgeni Mitkov (born 1972), Russian volleyball player 
Svetla Mitkova-Sınırtaş (born 1964), Bulgarian athlete
Tatyana Mitkova (born 1957), Russian television journalist 
Vasil Mitkov (1943–2002), Bulgarian football midfielder 
Vlatko Mitkov (born 1981), Macedonian handball player 
Yordan Mitkov (born 1956), Bulgarian weightlifter